Janneke Ensing (born 21 September 1986) is a Dutch former sportsperson, who competed in speed skating in the 2000s before becoming a cyclist, competing for seven different teams between 2009 and 2021.

Career

Speed skating
In 2002, she was the Dutch national C-junior champion. Two years later she won a bronze medal as a B-junior. At the 2007 KNSB Dutch Single Distance Championships Ensing finished 10th over 1500 metres. She also represented her country at the 2007 Winter Universiade held in Turin where she won the gold medal at the team pursuit together with Moniek Kleinsman and Diane Valkenburg. In 2010, Ensing finished fifth in the KNSB Dutch Allround Championships.

Cycling
Ensing started riding a bicycle in the summer as a means of cross-training before starting to compete in cycle racing. She initially continued speed skating alongside bike racing in order to earn money. During her career, Ensing focused on cycling to a greater extent, resulting in two runner up places at Gent–Wevelgem (2014 and 2015) as well as second in the 2016 Dutch National Road Race Championships and second in the 2017 Santos Women's Tour. She retired from cycling after the delayed 2021 edition of the Ronde van Drenthe, which passed through her hometown of Gieten.

Major results

2007
 5th Ronde Rondom de Bult van Usquert
 5th Lus van Roden
 6th Ronde van Heerenveen
 8th Profronde van Surhuisterveen
 9th Ronde van Noordhorn
2008
 3rd Uithuizen Criterium
 6th Ronde van Noordhorn
 7th Road race, Noord-Nederland Regional Road Championships
 8th Profronde van Surhuisterveen
 8th Enschede
2009
 1st Road race, Noord-Nederland Regional Road Championships
 2nd Gouden Pijl
 3rd Profronde van Surhuisterveen
2010
 1st Road race, Noord-Nederland Regional Road Championships
 1st Profronde van Surhuisterveen
 2nd Ronde van Enter
 2nd Ronde van Appelscha
 2nd Gouden Pijl
 3rd Lus van Roden
 3rd Wielerronde van Obdam
2011
 Noord-Nederland Regional Road Championships
1st Time trial
3rd Road race
 1st Ronde van Rijssen
 1st Gouden Pijl
 2nd Nacht van Hengelo
 2nd Ronde van Noordhorn
 2nd Wielerronde van Obdam
 2nd Dwars door de Westhoek
 3rd Ronde van Epe
 3rd Profronde van Surhuisterveen
 3rd Ridderronde Maastricht
 3rd Ronde van Appelscha
2012
 1st Ronde van Noordhorn
 9th Team time trial, UCI Road World Championships (with Martine Bras, Nina Kessler, Pauliena Rooijakkers, Winanda Spoor & Emma Trott)
2013
 3rd Ronde van Haren
 3rd Ronde Rondom de Bult van Usquert
2014
 2nd Gent–Wevelgem
 6th Novilon EDR Cup
2015
 2nd Gent–Wevelgem
 4th Overall Auensteiner–Radsporttage
 5th Omloop van het Hageland
 6th Marianne Vos Classic
 8th Trofee Maarten Wynants
2016
 2nd Road race, National Road Championships
 5th Overall La Route de France
1st  Mountains classification
2017
 1st  Mountains classification Ladies Tour of Norway
 2nd Overall Santos Women's Tour
1st  Mountains classification
 4th Overall Giro della Toscana Int. Femminile – Memorial Michela Fanini
1st Stage 1
 6th Overall BeNe Ladies Tour
 8th Overall Holland Ladies Tour
1st Stage 6
 8th Dwars door Vlaanderen
 8th La Flèche Wallonne Féminine
 9th Le Samyn des Dames
 9th Tour of Flanders for Women
2018
 1st Le Samyn des Dames
 6th Strade Bianche
 6th La Classique Morbihan
 10th Overall Women's Tour de Yorkshire
2019
 2nd Donostia San Sebastian Klasikoa
 4th Emakumeen Nafarroako Klasikoa
 5th Overall Setmana Ciclista Valenciana
 8th Strade Bianche

References

External links
 
 knsb.nl
 

1986 births
Dutch female speed skaters
Dutch female cyclists
Speed skaters at the 2007 Winter Universiade
Medalists at the 2007 Winter Universiade
People from Aa en Hunze
Living people
Sportspeople from Drenthe
Universiade gold medalists for the Netherlands
Universiade medalists in speed skating
21st-century Dutch women
Cyclists from Drenthe